Pită de Pecica is a Romanian round bread, roasted directly on hearth, specific from the town of Pecica in Arad County.

From 1980 to 1989, Pită de Pecica arrived daily on the table of President Nicolae Ceaușescu, who was impressed by its taste. It was transported by jet plane daily from Arad airport to the capital.

Pită de Pecica has been submitted for a protected designation of origin (PDO) by European Union.

See also
 List of breads

Notes and references 

Romanian breads